Goyal is a surname of Indian origin.

People with the surname Goyal and its variants include:

 Adarsh Kumar Goel
 Anita Goel
 Charti Lal Goel
 David Goel
 Devendra Goel
 Karan Goel
 Lalit Goel
 Malaika Goel
 Manish Goel
 Naresh Goyal
 Piyush Goyal
 Prabhu Goel
 Prem Shanker Goel
 Rajinder Goel
 Rajiv Goel
 Ram Niwas Goel
 Samant Goel
 Seema Goel
 Shiv Charan Goel
 Shyam Goel
 Suresh Goel
 Surily Goel
 Veena Goel
 Vijay Goel
 Vipul Goel
 Sita Ram Goel(Historian)

Indian surnames
Gotras of Barnwal